Glad I Found You is an album by American jazz pianist Horace Parlan featuring performances recorded in 1984 and released on the Danish-based SteepleChase label.

Reception
The Allmusic review by Scott Yanow awarded the album 4½ stars stating "Parlan sounds inspired by the other musicians on this spirited hard bop set".

Track listing
All compositions by Horace Parlan except as indicated
 "Monday Morning Blues" - 4:52  
 "Hip Walk" (Bernt Rosengren) - 10:06  
 "Oblivion" (Bud Powell) - 6:02  
 "Something for Silver" - 7:49  
 "Glad I Found You" (Al Levitt) - 6:58  
 "Afternoon in Paris" (John Lewis) - 6:32

Personnel
Horace Parlan - piano 
Thad Jones - flugelhorn
Eddie Harris - tenor saxophone
Jesper Lundgaard - bass
Aage Tanggaard - drums

References

SteepleChase Records albums
Horace Parlan albums
1984 albums